Roza Urbiybi Tazhibaykyzy Baglanova (January 1, 1922 – February 8, 2011) was a Soviet and Kazakh soprano opera and pop music singer. She was honoured with many awards throughout her career, including the People's Artist of the USSR (1967) and the Order of Lenin. She was also deemed a Hero of Kazakhstan.

Early life

Childhood and schooling 
Baglanova was born in Kazalinsk, in Kyzylorda Region. The Baglanov family consisted of grandmother Kundey, father Tazhibay, mother Akkurush, Tazhibai's second wife the Tatar Maryam, and older brother Idris. Roza spent her whole childhood on the left coast of the river Syr Darya. From the earliest years of her life, she dreamed of being a great singer. Her grandmother Kundey was a talented woman and she was the person who taught the child to sing. Her grandfather also loved singing, and together with his wife they used to perform at feasts. Her two mothers liked singing and playing the accordion, surrounding Baglanova with a love of art. Later Roza became an active member of the art club in the local theatre.

During her school years, Baglanova participated in many school, district, region, and republican concerts, including competitions in Kyzylorda, Almaty, Orenburg. With the help of her sonorous childish voice, Roza was the darling of the people and often won prizes.

When her father Tazhibay Baglanov passed away performing service duty, the family was left without the only breadwinner. Grandmother Kundey owned rich property, and exchanged jewellery, dishes, trays, spoons, belts, and bracelets for bread, tea, flour. Baglonova's grandmother and mothers sewed clothes and sold them to  feed the children. 

Famine in the Kazakh steppe began in 1932. It worsened the situation when combined with the death of the head of the family. When the winter started , Roza had no warm clothes to wear. There were no roads but only a steppe with impenetrable snowdrifts. As a child, Roza was muffled into blankets from head to foot, and wearing a head woollen scarf and homemade boots from the large felt mat, she walked 6 kilometers to school in the  blizzards every day.

Baglanova studied at the Kyzylorda Pedagogical Institute from 1939 to 1941. She dropped out from studying in the university in her third year since the material situation of her family had worsened.

Years in Uzbekistan 
Baglanova moved her relatives in Tashkent, the capital of Uzbekistan, and enrolled in the textile institute. In Tashkent she had a chance meeting with the soloist of the Tashkent Opera House and the director of the Uzbek philharmonic Mukhitdin Kari-Yakubov. He liked her singing and suggested she audition for the Uzbek Philharmonic. She was accepted there and performed as a soloist from 1941 to 1947. At one of her concerts, her singing impressed the First Secretary of the Central Committee of the Communist Party of Uzbekistan, Usman Yusupov. He provided Baglanova with a five-room apartment in the centre of the city and arranged to bring her remaining relatives to Tashkent. In the summer of 1941, on the coast of the reservoir in the village Kattakurgan, there was the second concert by Roza within the ensemble. Usman Yusupov attended and after the concert, he came to the singer and gave her 1000 roubles with a ticket to studying at the Moscow Conservatory.

Singer at the front 
After the outbreak of the Eastern Front of the Second World War (known as the Great Patriotic War), Baglanova and her choir went to the frontline to lift the spirit of the Soviet Army soldiers. She continued this activity for the next four years. The young star sang about 15 hours a day without a break despite the bad weather, blood, and flying bullets.

Thanks to this military period in her career, her collection of songs was filled with many military and folk compositions. The most popular song was “Ah, Samara-gorodok” from the repertoire of Lidia Ruslanova. Ruslanova liked how Baglanova performed the song and "gave" it to her. Baglanova sang in 20 various languages. It included all the languages that were spoken by soldiers from all the Soviet countries. She wanted to remind them by singing in their native languages about the homeland and bring some light memories despite the horrors of on-going war.

In 1943, Baglanova was injured in the eyes by artillery fire. Six operations were made to save her health. And even after being injured, she came back to the battlefield and helped medical staff to carry and bandage the soldiers.

Baglanova was the only Soviet artist who was twice awarded the medal “For Military Merit” in the period of the Great Patriotic War. Marshal Ivan Konev awarded her with the first medal on 1 May 1943. On 22 February 1945, Warsaw was freed from the occupying German forces. The ensemble of Tamara Khanum with Roza Baglanova and other members went to the city to perform to the seriously wounded soldiers who laid on the ground in the half-ruined buildings. After the victory in releasing the city, on the same day in 18:00, Konstantin Rokossovsky awarded Baglanova with the second medal “For Military Merit” in his residence.
 
On 2 May 1945, the singer returned to Moscow after getting within 90 kilometres from Berlin. In the capital, she celebrated the victory of the USSR and gave concerts with her ensemble.

Later life 

During World War II, Baglanova met Kazakh poet Zhuban Moldagaliev, who asked her to return to her motherland, Uzbekistan. After four years, in 1949, with the help of the chief secretary of the Communist Party of Kazakhstan, Zhumabay Shayakhmetov, and with the permission of the chief secretary of the Communist Party of Uzbekistan – Usman Yusupov, Baglanova returned to Kazakh SSR.

Living in Almaty from the beginning of 1949, she became a singer with the Kazakh State Academic Theatre of Opera and Ballet named after Abay, then the Jambyl Kazakh State Philharmonic (1960) and was a leading master of the Kazakh state concert association "Kazakhconcert". During her career, she performed in Poland, the German Democratic Republic, Belgium, Hungary, Austria, Czechoslovakia, the People's Republic of China, the Republic of Korea, India, Burma, Canada, and other countries. One of her passions was singing in the language of the country she was performing in, and so performed traditional folk songs in Russian, Kazakh, Uzbek, Tatar, Mongolian, Korean, and others. Her international repertoire included: "Ah, Samara-gorodok", "Dark Is the Night", "Vasya-Vasilek", "Ogonyok", Korean folk song "Doradi", Finnish folk song “Tuku-tuku”, Indian folk song “You stole my heart”, Kyrgyz folk song “Perizat-ou”, Uzbek folk song “Tam basynda turgan kyz” and many others.

In 1949, the head of the USSR Stalin turned seventy years old, and Roza took part in a large concert in the Kremlin dedicated to his anniversary. She sang two songs. Stalin gave her a standing ovation and his guests of honor followed after him: Mao Zedong, Jacques Duclos, Wilhelm Pieck, Klement Gottwald, and others.

In 1955, during a tour in India, she was awarded the title "People's Artist of the Kazakh SSR". In 1967 when she gave concerts in Semipalatinsk, she was awarded the highest title at that time "People's Artist of the USSR". She traveled all over the Soviet Union. She was with the builders of the Baikal–Amur Mainline, in the Kuril Islands with fishermen, on the island of Sakhalin. She went to every corner of Kazakhstan: at the Baikonur cosmodrome, with the fishermen of the Aral Sea, with livestock breeders in the most distant districts, on many stages of the Houses of Culture. She sang in auls (villages of the republic) sometimes right under the open sky, and on moonlit nights and hot days.

On December 13, 1979, during one of the concerts in the city of Pavlodar, her eyes darkened and she lost her vision. This was due to the wartime injury she received. The singer did not stop the concert and continued performing. Although she received treatment until April 1980, her vision was not restored. On April 5, 1980, at the Palace of the Republic, the big festive concert took place, and she performed at the stage with the help of her son. She began the concert with her favourite song, “Dark Is the Night”. While performing it, she tried to convey to the audience the inner anguish and bitterness of war. 

After that, she immediately flew to Moscow for an operation. She underwent three operations at once. The surgeons told her they needed another operation and explained why: one of the fragments from the mine was still in her head. The operation was completed successfully.

In November 2005, her eye disease worsened again. She went to hospital and underwent one more operation. According to her, she got well thanks to praying to God before the operation.

Becoming an international artist 
In 1949, Baglanova won the World Festival of Youth and Students in Budapest, which made her known internationally.

Maya Plisetskaya in her interview states:

‘...The citizens of Budapest did not know the song “Ah, Samara - gorodok” before that competition. But after the festival, they did not only accept the song but began to love listening to it. And this is the proof of the real singer... Before that year we did not know much about your country. Because of the war, there were not as many festivals and concerts in Almaty as nowadays. And we got introduced to Kazakhstan thanks to Roza.’ 

After the Festival, Baglanova and other competitors gave a concert on Margaret Island. There Plisetskaya danced “The Swan” of Saint-Saёns and Baglanova concluded the concert.

Right after the Festival, Baglanova and other winners of the contest had concerts in the countries of Europe such as Germany, Czechoslovakia, Austria, and Poland. When she was back in Kazakhstan, she continued her work as a singer and performed in 54 countries in more than 30 languages. She always started her performance with Kazakh songs and ended with, mostly, folk songs of the local nation.

Baglanova herself says about one of her performances abroad: ‘In 1957, I performed in the stage of the USA. There was a huge feast for the singers of the Soviet Union. When I entered the event with my national dress about 100 musicians started to play “Ah, Samara - gorodok”. I started the song right away and sang it in three languages: Russian, English, and French. The public was amazed, and applauded with compliments.'''

Baglanova visited many countries with state delegations. She was in India twice with the delegation of N. Khrushchev. The prime minister of India Jawaharlal Nehru himself gave a bouquet to the singer after her performance of the favourite song of Nehru's mother “You took my heart” in Hindi. On this visit, Roza also visited the house of Indira Gandy twice and got to know her personally.

Death
Baglanova died of a heart attack at the age of 89 in Alma-Ata.

 Family and children 
Baglanova married twice. Her first husband was the Hero of the USSR, Sadyk Abdizhapparov, with whom she lived for 7 years. The second was Satybaldy Zhappayev. They were together for almost 10 years. Roza herself said in her interviews that no man would be satisfied with her lifestyle that was full of different tours and the attention of the people. At the age of 47 the singer gave birth to a son named Tazhen. Later she had two grandchildren, Akerke and Tazhibay, by her son Tazhen and his wife Maral. One of the sons was named after her father. After the death of the singer, her son and daughter-in-law gave the name “Urbiybi” to their next daughter, after her grandmother, whose real name was Urbiybi.

 Social activism 
Though often portrayed as a small and elegant woman, with a gentle soprano singing voice, Roza Baglanoza was a formidable figure in many countries who commanded a great deal of respect and dared to challenge authority's decisions. She was able to use her fame and talent to fight for causes: equality, justice, and independence for an ordinary citizenry at a national level. 

Worried about the future of her country, Roza Baglanova was not alone in thinking that officials could do more, receiving handwritten letters with words of support from all parts of her homeland. 

Roza was one of the first civil rights activists in her country who succeeded in capturing the attention of the whole Soviet Union and focusing that attention to the environmentally harmful effects of some projects, including two major ecological disasters of the 20th century: the Aral Sea problem and the Semipalatinsk Test Site, also known as “The Polygon”."Look, what our “great scientists” along with a “highly respected” government have done to us! How can I talk about advanced innovations and the country's progress towards science, when they are literally killing and ruthlessly destroying the whole nation. We must get to the root of this problem," - she said at a conference in 1988, where the point at issue was the development of the state."There is a testing venue for the Soviet Union's nuclear weapons in Semipalatinsk. There is a spaceport, the Baikonur Cosmodrome, in the Kyzylorda Region. The Aral Sea, which once was a unique closed water reservoir, is practically on the verge of complete disappearance. Kazakhs are struggling, expiring… How can we live peacefully? If something similar had happened abroad, there would not have been any deathly silence. I have been there, in underprivileged and ailing places of our country. It breaks my heart to see human beings, dealing with the anguishes of serious illnesses, caused by your policies. Children have no other choice but to live without eyes, arms, legs… Who is responsible for that? Who is responsible for the constant pain and grief of the whole nation?" ''

It was hard to fundamentally alter the government's practices, since Roza Baglanova played no crucial part in the daily decision-making. Instead, she organised charitable concerts and festivals. Contributions were sought for ecological funds to ensure that all needy people would receive proper help.

Songs 
Baglanova's repertoire combined modern, national, symphonic, and culturally diverse melodies. Being introduced to Kazakhstan's leading artists and composers, she had a unique opportunity to enlarge an assortment of musical numbers.

Songs such as “Aq tamaq”, “Asyl arman” and “Qyz armany” had a renewed interest thanks to Baglanova's original performances and style. Nonetheless, it was “Ah, Samara - Gorodok”, the Russian folk song, once just a mundane composition, that turned her into a world-famous singer.

Tributes and memory 

Tributes poured in from all over the country for Baglanova when she died. A great number of people and government officials delivered the eulogy. TV channels collected research to make documentaries focused on her long life.

Some places and monuments in Kazakhstan have been named in her honour, most notably, the central street and a cultural centre of Aiyteke.

In 2015, a marble bust of Baglanova was unveiled in her own home town in the Kazaly region. It was created by Bakhytzhan Abishev, one of the best-known sculptors of Kazakhstan.

In January 2021, the President of Kazakhstan, Kassym-Jomart Tokayev, posted a tweet with an assurance to the country to build a historical monument in order to memorialise Baglanova and commemorate the 100th anniversary of the singer's birthday.

In 2021, UNESCO included Baglanova on the list of UNESCO anniversaries for 2022–2023 in honor of the 100th anniversary of her birth.

In April 2022, a monument to Baglanova was erected in Almaty. A bronze statue almost five meters tall is installed in front of the building of the Jambyl Kazakh State Philharmonic.

Awards

 People's Hero of Kazakhstan
 Order of Otan
People's Artist of Kazakh SSR
Medal "For Military Merit" (1945)
People's Artist of the USSR (1967)
Shapagat Medal (1995)
People's Artist of Kyrgyzstan (1996)
"Daneker" International Prize (2000)
Order of Lenin
Order of the Red Banner of Labor
Order of Friendship of Peoples
The Order of Honour
Public Prize "Tarlan" - "Contribution"

References

External links

1922 births
2011 deaths
Soviet women opera singers
People from Kyzylorda Region
Heroes of Kazakhstan
People's Artists of the USSR
Recipients of the Order of Friendship of Peoples
Recipients of the Order of Lenin
Recipients of the Order of the Red Banner of Labour
20th-century Kazakhstani women singers
Kazakhstani operatic sopranos
Soviet sopranos